Adam Willaerts (21 July 1577 – 4 April 1664) was a Dutch Golden Age painter.

Biography
Willaerts (occasionally Willarts, Willers) was born in London to Flemish parents who had fled from Antwerp for religious reasons. By 1585 the family lived in Leiden. From 1597 until his death, Adam lived and worked in Utrecht. He became a member of the Utrecht Guild of St. Luke in 1611 and subsequently became its dean in 1620. His sons Cornelis, Abraham, and Isaac followed in his footsteps.

He was known as a painter of river and canal pieces, coastal landscapes, fish-markets, processions, and genre scenes. He also painted villages and marine battle scenes.

His Allegory of the victory of the Dutch on the Spanish fleet in Gibraltar is in the Rijksmuseum.

Gallery

References
Adam Willaerts at the Netherlands Institute for Art History 
L. Otto Nelemans, Adam Willaerts, Londen 1577-Utrecht 1664. Zijn leven en zijn werk, de religieuze schilderijen in het bijzonder, 1999 (Doctoral dissertation in Dutch)

External links

1577 births
1664 deaths
Artists from Utrecht
Dutch Golden Age painters
Dutch male painters
Dutch marine artists
Painters from Utrecht